Justice Abai Ikwechegh (OFR) (7 September 1923 – 12 October 2020) was a Nigerian jurist.

Biography
Ikwechegh was born on 7 September 1923 in Igbere, in the Eastern part of Nigeria, to Chief Ogbonnaya Ikwechegh, a slave merchant and trader and Oyiri Ikwechegh. He began early schooling in Igbere and then later attended the Hope Waddell Training Institute in Calabar. He taught briefly at Abiriba and Ututu in Eastern Nigeria and then at Owo in Western Nigeria, Western Boys High School in Benin City and Enitona College in Port Harcourt. In 1951, he embarked on a journey to England to study law.

In 1955, he qualified as a lawyer and was called to the English Bar in the same year. He was of the Lincolns Inn barrister at Law. He was appointed a Magistrate in 1960. He was notable as a Magistrate for policing roads and arresting reckless taxi drivers and trying them himself. This pitched him against authorities and left many wondering if this was not an abuse of judicial powers. In 1972, he was appointed a Judge of the East Central State of Nigeria, He later became Judge of the Imo State judiciary and acted severally as the Chief Judge of the State. In 1982, he was appointed a Justice of the Court of Appeal. He declined this appointment but later buckled under pressure. He thereafter served and retired voluntarily from the Court of Appeal, in 1988.

During his career as a judge, he headed many panels, tribunals, and commissions of inquiry.  In January 1976, the government of East Central State appointed Ikwechegh to chair the Administrative Tribunal to investigate the circumstances which led to the execution of Contracts for Data Processing Equipment. Also in 1977, he was appointed by the Federal Military Government to the Land Acquisition Control Tribunal. He also headed the Imo State Chieftaincy Panel in 1978, known as the Ikwechegh Panel which had laid down guidelines for government recognition of Traditional Rulers. He also served as the first chairman of the Governing Council of the Federal Polytechnic, Nekede from January 1977 to June 1980. He also served as the chairman of the governing council of the Alvan Ikoku Federal College of Education, Owerri, from January 1991 to November 1992. He was succeeded by Professor M.O. Ijere. He was a devout Christian and an elder of the Presbyterian Church of Nigeria. He served also as chairman of the Board of Church Life of the Presbyterian Church with Phyllis Van Garpen as secretary. Ikwechegh would unabashedly declare both in open court as a judge and informal gathering of his conviction in the supremacy and healing power of God and as the only hope of redemption for mankind. He held the national honor of Officer of the Order of the Federal Republic of Nigeria.
He was married to Chief(Mrs) Mercy Ikwechegh and both had six children.
Ikwechegh died on 12 October 2020, aged 97.

References

1923 births
2020 deaths
Nigerian jurists
People from Abia State
Nigerian expatriates in the United Kingdom